Andrew Black may refer to:

 Andy Black (footballer) (1917–1989), Scottish international footballer
 Andy Black (poker player) (born 1965), Northern Irish poker professional
 Andrew Black (gambling entrepreneur) (born 1963), creator of Betfair
 Andrew Black (director) (born 1974), Scottish film director
 Andy Biersack (born 1990), musician with the alias Andy Black
 Andrew Black (footballer, born 1995), Scottish footballer
 Andrew Black (baritone) (1859–1920), Scottish baritone
 Andrew Black (rower) (born 1971), Australian rower